Fisnik Papuçi  (born 1 July 1983) is a Kosovar footballer who most recently played for SC Gjilani.

Club career
Born in Peć (Pejë), Socialist Autonomous Province of Kosovo, SR Serbia, SFR Yugoslavia (modern Kosovo), Papuçi played as defender for KF Elbasani in the Albanian Superliga and FK Jedinstvo Bijelo Polje in the Montenegrin First League.  In Kosovo he played with his home-town club KF Besa Pejë and also with KF Vëllaznimi and KF Hysi.

In July 2017 he joined Gjilani.

International career
He was part of the Kosovo national football team in 2007 and 2010.

References

1983 births
Living people
Sportspeople from Peja
Kosovan footballers
Kosovo pre-2014 international footballers
Association football fullbacks
KF Besa players
KF Elbasani players
KF Vëllaznimi players
FK Jedinstvo Bijelo Polje players
KF Hysi players
SC Gjilani players
Football Superleague of Kosovo players
Kosovan expatriate footballers
Expatriate footballers in Albania
Kosovan expatriate sportspeople in Albania
Expatriate footballers in Montenegro
Kosovan expatriate sportspeople in Montenegro